Duje Tomy "Tom" Grljusich (born 13 August 1940) is a former Australian rules footballer who played for South Fremantle in the Western Australian National Football League and Central District in the South Australian National Football League. Three of his brothers played league football – George and Don for South Fremantle and John for East Fremantle.

Playing career
Taking up playing football as an 18-year-old in 1958 for Cockburn Ex Scholars, he won the best and fairest award in his first year. After receiving offers from South Fremantle and East Fremantle, he joined South Fremantle before the 1959 season.

Grljusich made his league debut in round one of the 1960 season alongside his brother George. In 1965 he joined South Australian team Central District. At Central he won the club fairest and best award in 1966.

He rejoined South Fremantle in 1968, playing until 1976.  His 258 games for South Fremantle stood as the club's games played record for 27 years until it was exceeded by Marty Atkins in 2003.

Post retirement
After retiring as a player, Grljusich remained involved in football, acting as a runner for then-South Fremantle coach Mal Brown.  He has also worked as a real estate agent.

References

External links

Living people
1940 births
Australian rules footballers from Perth, Western Australia
South Fremantle Football Club players
Central District Football Club players
Australian people of Croatian descent
West Australian Football Hall of Fame inductees